The 1923 Buffalo Bisons football team represented the University of Buffalo as an independent during the 1923 college football season. Led by James Bond in his first season as head coach, the team compiled a record of 2–5–1.

Schedule

References

Buffalo
Buffalo Bulls football seasons
Buffalo Bison football